The arrondissement of Lesparre-Médoc is an arrondissement of France in the Gironde department in the Nouvelle-Aquitaine region. It has 49 communes.

Composition

The communes of the arrondissement of Lesparre-Médoc, and their INSEE codes, are:

 Arcins (33010)
 Arsac (33012)
 Avensan (33022)
 Bégadan (33038)
 Blaignan-Prignac (33055)
 Brach (33070)
 Carcans (33097)
 Castelnau-de-Médoc (33104)
 Cissac-Médoc (33125)
 Civrac-en-Médoc (33128)
 Couquèques (33134)
 Cussac-Fort-Médoc (33146)
 Gaillan-en-Médoc (33177)
 Grayan-et-l'Hôpital (33193)
 Hourtin (33203)
 Jau-Dignac-et-Loirac (33208)
 Labarde (33211)
 Lacanau (33214)
 Lamarque (33220)
 Lesparre-Médoc (33240)
 Listrac-Médoc (33248)
 Margaux-Cantenac (33268)
 Moulis-en-Médoc (33297)
 Naujac-sur-Mer (33300)
 Ordonnac (33309)
 Pauillac (33314)
 Le Porge (33333)
 Queyrac (33348)
 Saint-Christoly-Médoc (33383)
 Saint-Estèphe (33395)
 Saint-Germain-d'Esteuil (33412)
 Saint-Julien-Beychevelle (33423)
 Saint-Laurent-Médoc (33424)
 Saint-Sauveur (33471)
 Saint-Seurin-de-Cadourne (33476)
 Saint-Vivien-de-Médoc (33490)
 Saint-Yzans-de-Médoc (33493)
 Sainte-Hélène (33417)
 Salaunes (33494)
 Saumos (33503)
 Soulac-sur-Mer (33514)
 Soussans (33517)
 Talais (33521)
 Le Temple (33528)
 Valeyrac (33538)
 Vendays-Montalivet (33540)
 Vensac (33541)
 Le Verdon-sur-Mer (33544)
 Vertheuil (33545)

History

The arrondissement of Lesparre-Médoc was created in 1800, disbanded in 1926 and restored in 1942. At the May 2006 reorganisation of the arrondissements of Gironde, it gained the canton of Castelnau-de-Médoc from the arrondissement of Bordeaux.

As a result of the reorganisation of the cantons of France which came into effect in 2015, the borders of the cantons are no longer related to the borders of the arrondissements. The cantons of the arrondissement of Lesparre-Médoc were, as of January 2015:
 Castelnau-de-Médoc
 Lesparre-Médoc
 Pauillac
 Saint-Laurent-Médoc
 Saint-Vivien-de-Médoc

Sub-prefects
 1804-1814 :  
 1819-1830 :

References

Lesparre-Medoc